The Dormant Bank and Building Society Accounts Act 2008 (c 31) is an Act of the Parliament of the United Kingdom. It authorises the distribution, by the Big Lottery Fund, of assets from cash accounts that have been inactive for fifteen years.

Commencement

Parts 1 and 2 came into force on 12 March 2009. Part 3 came into force on 26 November 2008.

See also

Building Societies Act

References
Halsbury's Statutes,

External links
The Dormant Bank and Building Society Accounts Act 2008, as amended from the National Archives.
The Dormant Bank and Building Society Accounts Act 2008, as originally enacted from the National Archives.
Explanatory notes to the Dormant Bank and Building Society Accounts Act 2008.

United Kingdom Acts of Parliament 2008
2008 in economics
Banking legislation in the United Kingdom
Building societies of the United Kingdom